The 1932 Connecticut gubernatorial election was held on November 8, 1932. Incumbent Democrat Wilbur Lucius Cross defeated Republican nominee John H. Trumbull with 48.44% of the vote.

General election

Candidates
Major party candidates
Wilbur Lucius Cross, Democratic
John H. Trumbull, Republican

Other candidates
Jasper McLevy, Socialist
Albert Levitt, Independent
Michael P. O'Lean, Socialist Labor
Isadore Wofsy, Communist

Results

References

1932
Connecticut
Gubernatorial